Taher Ali Baig is an Indian playwright who has marked his directorial debut in theatre in 2014. He has written, directed and produced various house-full plays at venues like Bangalore Club, Secunderabad Club, Hyderabad Golf Club, Lamakaan, Hyderabad. The Deccan Chronicle has described him as the hitman of the theatre industry. Taher has conducted and organized  20 acting workshops which help boosting confidence, awareness and socialization skills. Taher has made advertising and corporate videos for clients like Kiana Skin Care, Optimus Manufacturers Pvt Ltd, Volvo Cars. Taher directed and wrote a short film Fitrat which has gone on to earn accolades at various film festivals across the globe, which include Best Director in AAB International Film Festival 2020, Critic's Choice Award in L’Age d’Or International Art-house Film Festival (LIAFF), Outstanding Achievement Award in World Film Carnival (WFC), Critic's Choice Award in Tagore International Film Festival (TIFF)  and many more. Sudhanshu Pandey and Rajit Kapur who played the lead did a marvelous job throughout.

Career
Taher started his career assisting director Nagesh Kukunoor. Taher later became a playwright and theatre director. He has directed and produced plays like Blithe Spirit, Ali Baba 40 Chor, Matilda, Superlosers, Horn Not Ok Please, Unforetold, Thinking Aloud and Jumanji which are runaway success every time due to absorbing stories, witty dialogues, stellar cast and visionary direction that captivate the audience. In 2014 he has directed a play called Distant Plateau which has the largest audience. Taher is even known for getting some successful plays to Hyderabad like Sharman Joshi starrer Raju Raja Ram aur Main and Rajit Kapur starer  Mosambi Narangi.

Plays

Filmography

References

Indian dramatists and playwrights
Living people
Year of birth missing (living people)